Exakt Entertainment was an American video game developer, founded in 1999, based in Los Angeles, California.

Games developed

References

External links 
 
 Company summary from MobyGames
 Company summary  from GameSpot
 Company summary from IGN

Video game companies of the United States
Video game companies established in 1999
1999 establishments in California